Ripoll is the capital of the comarca of Ripollès, Catalonia, Spain.

Ripoll may also refer to:

People
Shakira Ripoll (born 1977), Colombian musician
Bernie Ripoll (born 1966), former Australian politician
Edward Ripoll (1924–2006), American politician
Emilio Castelar y Ripoll (1832–1899), Spanish Republican politician
Sylvain Ripoll (born 1971), French former football player
Tomás Ripoll (died 1747), former Master of the Order of Preachers
Cayetano Ripoll (1778–1826), Spanish schoolteacher
Vilma Ripoll (born 1954), Argentine nurse and politician
Álvaro Antón Ripoll (born 1994), Spanish footballer

Other uses
228133 Ripoll, a minor planet
Ripoll (river), Catalonia, Spain

Catalan-language surnames